Pay Commission is set up by Government of India, and gives its recommendations regarding changes in salary structure of its employees set up in 1947, Since India's Independence, seven pay commissions have been set up on a regular basis to review and make recommendations on the work and pay structure of all civil and military divisions of the Government of India. Headquartered in Delhi(India), the commission is given 18 months from date of its constitution to make its recommendations.

First Pay Commission
The first pay commission was established on January, 1946 and it submitted its report in May, 1947 to the interim government of India.
It was under the chairmanship of Srinivasa Varadachariar.  The mandate of 1st (nine members) was to examine and recommend emolument structure of Civilian employees.

Post War Pay Committee for the armed Forces experience

Armed forces emoluments structure was determined not by the 1st Central Pay Commission(CPC)  but by a Departmental Committee which had service members.  The task of this committee was to make recommendations "in the structure of emoluments and benefits of service personnel in the light of the recommendations made by the pay commission for civilian employees".  The First Pay Committee, set up after the 1st pay Commission, was called "The Post War Pay Committee for the armed Forces". The New Pay Code effective from 1 July 1947 was based on the recommendations of this committee. The pensionary benefits were examined by separate committee called " Armed Forces Pension Revision Committee (1949–50)".

Second Pay Commission
The second pay commission was set up in August 1957, 10 years after independence and it gave its report after two years. The recommendations of the second pay commission had a financial impact of ₹ 39.6 crore. The chairman of the second pay commission was Jagannath Das.

Raghuramiah Committee

The Departmental Pay Committee, set up after the 2nd pay Commission, was called, the Raghuramiah Committee(1960), which had service representatives. It examined armed forces emoluments and made recommendations .

Third Pay Commission
The third pay commission set up in April 1970 gave its report in March 1973.

Third Pay Commission and the Armed forces

Introduction.

1. 3rd CPC was the first CPC for Defence Forces. I quote from para 5, chapter 48 Vol 3 of the report,
"5. It is for the first time that a Pay Commission has been asked to enquire into the, structure of
emoluments of both the civilian employees, of the Government and the Armed Forces. In the past,
the latter, was entrusted to departmental committees which included the representatives of the
Services also."

2. There was no bureaucratic interference in proposals made by services. Ex Chiefs Gen
Kumaramangalam and Adm Chatterjea were invited for discussions besides some other veteran
officers. I quote from para 7, chapter Report of the Third Central Pay Commission, 1973.Vol.IV. 48 Vol 3.
"Report of the Expert Cell was finalised only by the Service members. The Ministry of Defence in, their
letter forwarding the Report of the Expert Cell in June, 1971, clarified that "the views contained in
the Report are those of the Service Experts, as endorsed by the three Service Chiefs".

3. Commission also visited forward posts at heights of 13000 feet, air bases, ships, submarines,
ordnance depots, hospitals, etc. to gain first hand experience of service hardships.
There is no evidence of any bureaucratic or political interference in the report. The CPC was headed
by a retired Supreme Court justice, Shri Raghubar Dayal.Report of the Third Central Pay Commission, 1973.Vol.III.

The commission was of the view that the most practical and equitable method for determining Service pays would be on the basis of fair comparison with the pay rates fixed for the civilian employees of the Central Government. This nexus becomes all the more relevant and desirable when we recall that recruitment to our Armed Forces is on a voluntary basis, which means that persons have to be attracted from civilian life. The quality of recruitment to 
the Armed Forces will be satisfactory only if Service pays are comparable to levels of remuneration in 
civilian employment. A link between the two is therefore, inherent in the case of volunteer armed 
forces.

In 1973, the Government implemented the following changes in pensions of the Armed Forces:

Pensions before 3rd CPC. Pensions were worked in fractions and not in percentages, as is being
claimed by many dubious sources. For ease of understanding, fractions will be converted to
percentage in subsequent text.

Armed forces Pensions. Armed forces pay and pensions were lower than those of the Britishers.
During second world war these were hiked for obvious reasons. After world war was over these were
reduced drastically and brought more or less in line with civilians. After Independence, pensions of
Armed Forces were fixed by Armed Forces Pension Revision Committee (AFPRC). Its
recommendations were implemented wef 1st Jun 1953. Pensions remained more or less fixed till next
pay commission for civilians was finalised. For example, a Lt Col drew a fixed pension of Rs.625/- from
Jun 1953 till Oct 1961. No DA/DR was admissible to pensioners before 3rd CPC. Later pension was increased to Rs 675 in Oct 1961. In Sep 1970 pension was reduced to Rs 587/- to compensate for
grant of Death Cum Retirement Gratuity (DCR).
As for as PBOR are concerned, upper retirement age was 50 years for Army and 55 years for other
two services. For officers and PBOR, AFPRC used the formula of 1/60 to work out pensions rank wise.
Maximum pension was capped at 30 years of service. A person retiring with 30 years or more of
service got a pension 30/60 (50%) of the rank emoluments. The pension was not worked for
individuals. It was worked rank wise. Rank was to be held for at least 2 years to get pension for the
same rank. However, it was based on the minimum pay of the rank for officers and mean of the pay
group for PBOR. There was a depression of 2 years for PBOR who served from 15 years to 25 years.
Therefore, soldiers were compensated for 13 years of service while they actually served for 15 years
and so on. This depression was removed in 1968. Service pensioners did not receive any DCR till 1970.
In 1970, DCR was introduced, where as civilians were receiving DCR since 1950 with their pensions
reduced proportionately from 1/60 (50%) to 1/80 (37.5%). The loss of pension was 12.5% to
compensate for DCR. On similar lines, to compensate for DCR in 1970, officer's pension was reduced
by appx 8% and PBOR 11%.
From the information given above, it is evident that before 3rd CPC a PBOR retiring with 15 years of
service got a pension of 15/60 (25%) less 11%. A PBOR retiring with 30 and more years of service got
30/60 (50%) less 11%, appx. 39% of his emoluments as pension. It is clear that no PBOR got a pension
of more than 39% of emoluments contrary to the belief that the PBOR pensions were 70% before 3rd
CPC and OROP was in vogue.Report of the Third Central Pay Commission, 1973.Vol.III.

Liberalised Family Pension: Conditions. Mrs Indra Gandhi for the first time introduced Liberalised Family Pension for war widows and their children. It was made effective from 1947 to include all past operations including Counter Insurgency Operations. In case of death of an Armed Forces Personnel under the circumstances mentioned below, the eligible member of the family is entitled to Liberalised Family Pension equal to reckonable emoluments last drawn, both for officers and PBOR. Liberalised Family Pension at this rate is admissible to the widow in the case of officers and to the nominated heir in the case of PBOR until death or disqualification.

G.O.I, M.O.D. vide its letter No. 200847/Pen-C/71 dt. 24.2.72, decided to grant Liberalized Pensionary Awards equivalent to the basic pay +increments +rank pay +good service pay+ dearness pay + home saving element to the nominated heir of PBORs of Armed Forces personnel as well as NCs(E), (including APS and DSC personnel), who were killed in action or disabled in the operations against any neighboring country and as well as in following actions:

1.1947–48 Kashmir Operations, international wars of 1962, 1965 (including Kutch and Kargil Ops.), 1971, as well as Goa and Hyderabad operations.

2.In warlike operations or border skirmishes either with Pakistan on cease fire line or any other country, operation against armed hostiles like Naga & Mizos and also while deployed in peace-keeping mission abroad.

3.During laying or clearance of mines .

These benefits were granted wef 1-2-1972 to the nominated heirs / NoKs of all personnel who were killed in above actions and operations from 1947 to 1948 onwards.

Rates of Liberalised Family Pension. Under this category nominated heir of the PBOR will be granted Lib. Family Pension equal to the reckonable emoluments last drawn which includes Pay in pay band + GP + MSP + X Group Pay if any + Classification allowance actual drawn if any until death or disqualification. If a PBOR is not survived by widow but is survived by child (ren) only, all children together shall be eligible for Lib. Family Pension at the rate equal to 60% of reckonable emoluments till his/her disqualification i.e. attaining the age of 25 years. On death / disqualification of senior most children it will pass on to next eligible child. And the crippled child if any will be granted continuance award of family pension when all children become disqualified. The crippled child will continue to receive this award for life at the rate equivalent to 60% of Liberalised Family pension.
Link for Liberalised Family Pensions

In addition, Civilians serving in field formations (cooks, washer up, water carriers etc.) were given uniform and made NC(E)s.

Civilian Pensions. As far as Civilian pensions are concerned, their retirement age varied from 50 years for senior officers to 58 years for class 4 employees. Till 1950 they were not getting DCR and
their pension was based on 1/60 formula and capped at 30 years of service. They received 30/60 (50%)
of the last three years of average emoluments as pension. In 1950 DCR was introduced and their
maximum pension reduced to 30/80 (37.5%). This continued till 3rd CPC. Therefore, Civilians as well
as PBOR were drawing less than 40% of emoluments as pension by more or less using similar formulas.
Both were getting similar DCR too. There was no DA/DR for any one. PBOR had no advantage on
account of early retirement.Report of the Third Central Pay Commission, 1973.Vol.IV.

Post 3rd CPC Pensions. Civilian pension formula wasn't altered much. The significant change was
to increase qualifying service for pension from 30 to 33 years. There after, maximum pension
improved to 33/80 (41.25%) for 33 years of service. Formula for DR was worked out. I quote from
para 92 Vol IV,

“We have received numerous representations suggesting that we should recommend some
measures for protecting the pensions of the existing Government employees from erosion O!l
account of the possible increases m the cost of Living in future.We recommend that all future
pensioners, irrespective of the amount of pension drawn by them, should be given a relief at the rate
of 5 per cent of their pension subject to a minimum of Rs 5 per mensem and a maximum of Rs. 25 per
mensem. The relief at these rates should be given as and when there is a 16 points rise in the
12-monthly average of the All India Working Class Consumer Price Index (1960=100).”

On the other hand, service pensions were revamped. Same 33/80 formula was used to work out
defence pensions. There was no change in rank criteria for earning pension. Pensions were granted as
per rank held for two years. Improvements were done to base pensions on the maximum pay of the
rank and not minimum/mean pay as was the case earlier. The main highlight of the 3rd CPC was that
for the first time weightage was given to Armed Forces for early retirement and DR granted.
PBOR, Lt Colonels, Colonels and Brigadiers got a weightage of 5 years, Majors 6 years and Captains and
below 7 years. This resulted in a PBOR retiring with 15 years of service getting a pension @ 20/80
(25%) compared to 15/80 (18.75%) received by a civilian. A PBOR retiring with 28 years of service
received 33/80 (41.25%) in comparison to civilian who received a lower percentage of 28/80 (35%).
Hence, for the first time since independence Armed Forces had an edge over civilians in pensions.

Fourth Pay Commission
Constituted in June 1983, its report was given in three phases within four years and the financial burden to the government was ₹ 1282 crore. This commission has been set up on dated 18.3.1987, Gazette of India (Extra ordinary) Notification No 91 dated 18.3.1987,
The chairman of fourth pay commission was P N Singhal.

Fourth Pay Commission and the Armed forces
Indian National Congress (I) Government, headed by Rajiv Gandhi, in the wake of the 4th CPC to implemented concept of 'Rank Pay' for armed forces officer. Rank Pay affected all officers ranks from second lieutenant to brigadier in the army, and equivalent ranks in the Indian Air Force and the Indian Navy. The 'rank pay', which varied from 200 to 1200, was not an additional pay, but amount deducted from their pay grade. This ended long established err Military Indian Police service equations. Police Officers, and officers from other AIS officers, with 14 years of service, who were formerly in the same pay grade as majors, with 14 years service, were equated to Brigadiers, on the basis of the new pay grades. Maj General Satbir Singh an expert on Police- military rank structures and pay grades, called rank pay, "rarest of rare fraud, perjury and Injustice to the defence forces".

He explained, "How could it be allowed that the first military rank of Second Lieutenant along with two promotional ranks of Lieutenant and Captain were all clubbed with the first civilian rank?". Similarly at the level of major "rank pay' had the effect of promoting civilian pay grades equal to major till the 3 CPC, to that of Colonels." The rank pay became an issue of considerable resentment in the armed forces, and cause of general distrust of the pay commissions, and the Congress I Government. Eventually, Maj AK Dhanapalan, a retired major, litigates 'rank Pay'. After protracted legal struggle high court, despite many appeals, in a landmark decision declares the 'rank pay' concept illegal. In its judgment the SC notes that the 'rank pay' was wrongly deducted from basic pay and ordered re-fixation of pay "with effect from" and not "as on" 1 January 1986.

Fifth Pay Commission
The notification for setting up the Fifth CPC was issued on 9 April 1994, but started functioning only on 2 May 1994, with the assumption of charge by the Member Secretary.
The chairman of fifth pay commission was Justice S. Ratnavel Pandian. the members were: Suresh Tendulkar, Professor Delhi School of Economics; and M.K Kaw, IAS. In comparison, First CPC had nine members including military members, the second had six members including a military member, the 3 CPC and 4 CPC had five, but no military member. The fifth had three members, but no military member. The first had no member secretary, just a secretary. After the 1 CPC all pay commissions have had a member secretary, and invariably from the IAS.

The 5 CPC report, a massive tome, had nine part in 172 chapters. It took three years with a sanctioned staff 107, which ballooned to 141, to prepare the report. By way of comparison, 4 CPC took 209 bureaucrat Accounts Service, Indian Revenue Service, Indian Economic Service, Central Secretariat Service, Border Security Force, Geological Survey of India, Central Public Works Department and National Informatics Centre.It cost ₹ 17,000 crore.

Part VI of report dealt with pensions and retirement benefits for civilian; Part VII dealt with pay scales and allowances of Armed Forces personnel. Part IX is the concluding part of the Report.

Financial Impact of Fifth pay commission

Other recommendations 
One of its recommendations was to slash government workforce by about 30%. It also recommended to reduce the number of pay scale from 51 to 34 and to not recruit to about 3,50,000 vacant position in the government. None of these recommendations were implemented.

Criticisms by World Bank

Fifth Pay Commission and the Armed forces

Terms of Reference
The 4CPC, for unknown reasons, had no separate TORs for the Armed Forces. The 5 CPC, however, for the first time was asked to examine the terms and conditions of the Armed Forces, and make suggestions for what is "considered desirable and feasible".
Thus, the pay commission noted ambiguously that "even their recommendations with regard to changes in the structure of emoluments including death cum gratuity in respect of Armed Forces Personnel had to be made with due regard to the terms and conditions of their service"

Lateral Transfer 
The 5 CPC, in its report submitted in January 1997, recommended increase in posts for Armed Forces personnel in Group C and D in Central Armed Police Forces (CAPFs) from 10 to 25percent. For Short Service Commissioned Officers, on completion of their military service, 5 CPC recommended earmarking 25 percent officer's post in the CAPFs. These recommendations by the pay Commission were intended to reduce the defence pension bill; save on training and recruitment costs; provide trained manpower to government departments; and provide soldiers a second career after their term of military engagement.

These recommendations of the Pay Commission were, however, mostly ignored by the Janata Dal (United Front), and BJP Government of Atal Bihari Vajpayee that followed. Mulayam Singh Yadav, Defence Minister (1 June 1996 – 19 March 1998), Indrajit Gupta (Communist Party of India-United Front), Home Minister (29 June 1996 – 19 March 1998), and L K Advani (BJP), Home Minister (19 March 1998 – 22 May 2004) did little to implement these recommendations. The problem festered, and the pension bill ballooned.

Sixth Pay Commission

In July 2006, the Cabinet approved setting up of the sixth pay commission. This commission has been set up under Justice B.N.Srikrishna with a timeframe of 18 months. The cost of hikes in salaries is anticipated to be about ₹ 20,000 crore for a total of 5.5 million government employees as per media speculation on the 6th Pay Commission, the report of which is expected to be handed over in late March/early April 2008. The employees had threatened to go on a nationwide strike if the government failed to hike their salaries. Reasons for the demand of hikes include rising inflation and rising pay in the private sector due to the forces of Globalization.
The Class 1 officers in India are grossly underpaid with an IAS officer with 25 years of work experience earning just Rs.55,000 as his take home pay.
Pay arrears are due from January 2006 till September 2008. Almost all the Government employees received 40% of the pay arrears in 2008 and balance 60% arrears (as promised by Government) has also been credited in Government employees account in 2009. The Sixth Pay Commission mainly focused on removing ambiguity in respect of various pay scales and mainly focused on reducing number of pay scales and bring the idea of pay bands. It recommended for removal of Group-D cadre.

Seventh Pay Commission
The Government of India has initiated the process to constitute the 7th Central Pay Commission along with finalisation of its Terms of Reference, the composition and the possible timeframe for submission of its Report.
On 25 September 2013 then Finance Minister P Chidambaram announced that Prime Minister Manmohan Singh has approved the constitution of the 7th Pay Commission. Its recommendations are likely to be implemented with effect from 1 January 2016. 
Justice A.K Mathur will be heading the Seventh Pay Commission, announcement of which was done on 4 February 2014
. On 29 June 2016, Government accepted the recommendation of 7th Pay Commission Report with meager increase in salary of 14% after six months of intense evaluation and successive discussion.

Composition 

In May 2014, a group of retired government officials, challenged the inclusion of a senior IAS officer in the three-member 7th Pay Commission, in the Delhi High Court. They alleged that this would lead an inherent bias in the commission's recommendations towards IAS officers.

On 9 November 2017, the government raised the maximum amount that a central government employee can borrow from the government to Rs 25 lakh for new construction/purchase of new house/flat 
Earlier this limit was only Rs 7.50 lakh. This move is going to benefit about 50 lakh central government employees all over India.
The employee can borrow up to 34 months of the basic pay to a maximum of Rs 25 lakh, or cost of the house/flat, or the amount according to repaying capacity, whichever is the least.
If both spouses are central government employees, they can take Housing Building Advance (HBA) either jointly, or separately. Also, the rate of Interest on HBA will be only 8.50% at simple interest.

SC constitute a new Pay commission for trial court judges
On 19 November 2015, the 7th Central Pay Commission recommended 23.55% hike in pay and allowances which will be implemented from 1 January 2016. The full report is available on the website of Ministry of Finance, Government of India

The Union Cabinet approves 7th Pay panel recommendations on 29 June 2016. The recommendations will be effected from 1 January 2016 with arrears to be paid in the financial year 2016-17 itself unlike previously, when arrears were paid in the following financial year. Also this time, employees will had to wait only 6 months for the CPC's recommendations to be implemented as compared to 19 months for the 5th CPC and 32 months for the 6th except for autonomous organizations like CSIR, ICAR, ICMR etc. under various ministries.

Seventh Pay Commission and the Armed forces 
The recommendation of the 7CPC affecting the armed forces are a cause of profound unease and resentment in the Armed Forces, especially, 7CPC recommendation on separate 'Pay Matrices', and allowance system for the armed forces and defence civilians, and police, and other civil servants. While 7CPC provides for mandated timescale promotions to Defence civilians from audit and account services, police, and other officers at regular intervals of 4, 9, 13, 14, and 16 years of service; it does not do so for the armed forces officers. The orders implemented by the government on the basis of 7 CPC recommendation, despite armed forces advise and concerns, make time scale police officers and defence civilians with lesser service and experience, senior to armed forces officers, and potentially in command of armed forces officers of equal or senior ranks. For instance, Wing Commanders of the Air Force, commander of the navy, and Lt colonel of the army, with 13 years of service, according to MOD implementation tables, will be subordinate in 'level', rank, pay scale, and organizational hierarchy than police officers, auditors and accountants, with equal or even lesser service. MOD implementation order has created an invidious situation for armed forces officers when serving alongside defence civilians and police officers. According to the MOD orders, a police officer and Defence Accounts officer with 14 years service will be at higher level than the naval officer in command of INS Vikramaditya, India's Aircraft carrier, a highly selective rank and appointment, with some 20 years of service.

In March 2016, eighteen former heads of the Armed forces, including General Ved Prakash Malik (former Chief of Army Staff) and Admiral Arun Prakash (former Chief of naval staff) sent a joint letter to Narendra Modi, the Prime Minister, conveying their distress and alarm on the flawed approach and contentious recommendations of the 7CPC. The representations by former Chiefs and the Chiefs of Staff to the MOD, the PM and other bureaucratic bodies reviewing the 7CPC recommendations were in vain. On 25 July 2016, without addressing or taking into account the key concerns of the armed forces, the Government issued instructions implementing 7CPC's "general recommendations on pay without any material alteration" including separate "Pay Matrices" (for civilians) and the armed forces.

See also
One Rank, One Pension
Rank Pay
7th Central Pay Commission (CPC) and Defence Forces
Special Duty Allowance (SDA)

References

External links
 Seventh Pay Commission, Official website
 Report of the Sixth Central Pay Commission Ministry of Finance

Pay Commission Key Points
7th Pay Commission News for Central Government Employees
Latest News on Seventh Pay Commission
Reference App for Central Government Employees

Government finances in India
Indian commissions and inquiries
1946 establishments in India
Wages and salaries
Ministry of Finance (India)